is a Japanese professional basketball player for Chiba Jets of the B.League in Japan. He played college basketball for Tokai University.

On August 20, 2018, the Japanese Olympic Committee penalized Sato after he was found to have solicited prostitutes while visiting Jakarta. He was ultimately suspended from official competition for a year.

References

1995 births
Living people
Tokai University alumni
Japanese men's basketball players
Shiga Lakes players
Sportspeople from Hokkaido
Small forwards
Basketball players at the 2018 Asian Games
Asian Games competitors for Japan